The  was a type of headgear worn by the officers of the Imperial Japanese Army troops in the Boshin War (1868–69). The headgear was quite peculiar, being a sort of wig composed of long, dyed yak hair and held in place by a chin-strap.

 indicated officers from the Tosa Domain, whereas  indicated officers from the Chōshū Domain, and  indicated officers from the Satsuma Domain.

Today, headgear similar to the historical  is also worn during processions such as the Gion Festival.

References

Boshin War
Japanese headgear
Headgear